Thomas John Hopko (March 28, 1939 – March 18, 2015) was an Eastern Orthodox Christian priest and theologian. He was the Dean of Saint Vladimir’s Orthodox Theological Seminary from September 1992  until July 1, 2002 and taught dogmatic theology  there from 1968 until 2002. In retirement, he carried the honorary title of Dean Emeritus.

Life and education
Thomas Hopko was born in Endicott, New York of Rusyn descent. His ancestors are linked to the Rusyn village of Naviczke (now Nevyts'ke) near the city of Uzhorod. He was baptized and raised in St. Mary’s Carpatho-Russian Orthodox Greek-Catholic Church, Endicott. He gained his B.A. in Russian studies at Fordham University in 1960, followed by a Master of Divinity degree at St. Vladimir's Orthodox Theological Seminary in 1963. He later completed a master's degree in philosophy at Duquesne University in 1968 and a Ph.D. in theology at Fordham University in 1982.
At St. Vladimir's Seminary, Hopko studied with such renowned Orthodox theologians as Fr. Alexander Schmemann, Fr. John Meyendorff, Nicholas Arseniev and Serge Verkhovskoy. He was ordained to the priesthood in 1963 and served several parishes in the states of Ohio and New York. In 1968 he began to teach at St. Vladimir's and eventually succeeded his teacher Serge Verkhovskoy as professor of dogmatic theology. He was elevated to the rank of archpriest in 1970 and, upon his election as dean, to the rank of protopresbyter (1995).

Activities and affiliations
Hopko was an Orthodox Christian lecturer and speaker, known both in Orthodox and ecumenical circles. He served as a member of the Faith and Order Commission of the World Council of Churches and as a delegate from the Orthodox Church in America to the Assemblies of WCC in Uppsala, Sweden, and Nairobi, Kenya. He was also President of the Orthodox Theological Society in America (1992–1995). In retirement, he had several popular podcasts on Ancient Faith Radio.

Hopko has written about the ordination of women and the reasons for its rejection in the Eastern Orthodox Church.

Works

Podcasts 
Speaking the Truth in Love
The Names of Jesus
Worship in Spirit and Truth

Writings 
All the Fulness of God: Essays on Orthodoxy, Ecumenism and Modern Society
Speaking The Truth In Love: Education, Mission, And Witness In Contemporary Orthodoxy
If We Confess Our Sins: Preparation and Prayers
The Lenten Spring: Readings for Great Lent
The Winter Pascha: Readings for the Christmas-Epiphany Season
The Orthodox Faith Volume One: Doctrine and Scripture
The Orthodox Faith Volume Two: Worship
The Orthodox Faith Volume Three: Church History
The Orthodox Faith Volume Four: Spirituality

Death 
Hopko died of complications from congestive heart failure due to amyloidosis on March 18, 2015, in the Pittsburgh suburb of Wexford, Pennsylvania. He was survived by his wife and five children. Days before his death, his daughter Juliana created a blog wherein she provided periodic status updates about his declining health and eventual death.

References

External links
 

1939 births
2015 deaths
People from Endicott, New York
American people of Rusyn descent
Eastern Orthodox theologians
Members of the Orthodox Church in America
Fordham University alumni
Duquesne University alumni